The SAS language is a computer programming language used for statistical analysis, created by Anthony James Barr at North Carolina State University. It can read in data from common spreadsheets and databases and output the results of statistical analyses in tables, graphs, and as RTF, HTML and PDF documents. The SAS language runs under compilers that can be used on Microsoft Windows, Linux, and various other UNIX and  mainframe computers.
The SAS System and World Programming System (WPS) are SAS language compilers.

Overview of syntax 
The language is Turing-complete domain specific computer language with many of the attributes of a command language.  It is narrowly focused on statistical analysis of data.
The language consists of two main types of blocks: DATA blocks that introduce new datasets and PROC blocks that perform procedures on them. A simple example is the following
* COMMMENT
Data TEMP;
   input X Y Z;
   datalines;
1 2 3
5 6 7
;

PROC PRINT DATA = TEMP;
RUN;
SAS scripts have the .sas extension

Legal status 
SAS is developed and sponsored by the SAS Institute.  A competitor, World Programming System has developed an interpreter and tools that allows execution of the SAS scripts.

See also 

 SAS Institute
 SAS Software
 World Programming System
 List of statistical packages
 Comparison of statistical packages
 SAS Institute Inc v World Programming Ltd

Notes

References

External links 
 Learn SAS Programming
 comp.soft-sys.sas at Google Groups.
 UK High Court Judgement on SAS Language
 Sasopedia / SAS Language elements
 SAS whitepaper search

Statistical programming languages